The 2019–20 AC Sparta Prague season was the club's 125th season in existence and the 27th consecutive season in the top flight of Czech football. In addition to the domestic league, AC Sparta Prague participated in this season's editions of the Czech Cup and the UEFA Europa League. The season covered the period from 1 July 2019 to 8 July 2020.

Players

Current squad
.

Out on loan

Pre-season and friendlies

Competitions

Overview

Czech First League

Regular stage

League table

Results summary

Results by round

Matches

Championship group

League table

Results summary

Results by round

Matches

Czech Cup

UEFA Europa League

Qualifying rounds

Third qualifying round

References

External links

AC Sparta Prague seasons
Sparta Prague
Sparta Prague